The 1954–55 Football League season was Birmingham City Football Club's 52nd in the Football League and their 24th in the Second Division. They finished top of the 22-team division on goal average, thus winning the Second Division title for the fourth time and gaining promotion to the First Division for 1955–56. They entered the 1954–55 FA Cup at the third round proper and lost to Manchester City in the sixth round (quarter-final).

Bob Brocklebank and chief scout Walter Taylor laid the foundations for the club's successes of the 1950s, introducing future England internationals Trevor Smith and Jeff Hall to the side, and bringing in the likes of Peter Murphy, Eddy Brown, Roy Warhurst and Alex Govan.
Arthur Turner took over from Brocklebank as manager in November 1954 with the club mid-table in the Second Division, having gained only one point away from home. By the end of the season they had scored 92 goals,
inflicted Liverpool's record defeat, by nine goals to one, which was also Birmingham's widest margin of victory in a league match since the 19th century, and, needing five points from the last three games, all away from home, to be sure of promotion, confirmed themselves as champions with a 5–1 win in the last game of the season away at Doncaster Rovers.

Twenty-five players made at least one appearance in nationally organised first-team competition, and there were eleven different goalscorers. Half-back Len Boyd played in 43 of the 46 first-team matches over the season, and Peter Murphy was leading goalscorer with 20 goals, all scored in league competition. All five first-choice forwards – Gordon Astall, Noel Kinsey, Brown, Murphy and Govan – reached double figures.

Football League Second Division

League table (part)

FA Cup

Appearances and goals

Players with name struck through and marked  left the club during the playing season.

See also
Birmingham City F.C. seasons

References
General
 
 
 Source for match dates and results: 
 Source for lineups, appearances, goalscorers and attendances: Matthews (2010), Complete Record, pp. 344–45.
 Source for kit: "Birmingham City". Historical Football Kits. Retrieved 22 May 2018.

Specific

Birmingham City F.C. seasons
Birmingham City